Genneteil is a former commune in the Maine-et-Loire department in western France. On 15 December 2016, it was merged into the new commune Noyant-Villages.

See also
Communes of the Maine-et-Loire department

References

Former communes of Maine-et-Loire